The Julaolinja (Ulaolinya, Yurlayurlanya) were an indigenous Australian people of the state of Queensland.

Country

History
The Julaolinja, according to Kevin Tibbett, were one of three tribes, the other two being the Wongkadjera and the Rungarungawa, whose position around the pituri growing area of the Mulligan River enabled them to control the trade routes from the northeast through to the southwest, by using the native narcotic and stone axes from the north as trading goods.

With the onset of colonial settlement of their lands, they eventually shifted east to the area around Marion Downs.

Alternative names
 Judanja
 Judanji
 Jura
 U-la-linya, U-la-linye,U-lay-linye
 Ulaolinja
 Ulaolinya
 Uluonga
 Yoolanlanya

Source:

Some words
 kurna (man)
 woilla (woman)

Notes

Citations

Sources

Aboriginal peoples of Queensland